Masanori is a masculine Japanese given name.

Kanji and meaning
The name Masanori is generally written with two kanji, the first read  and the second read , for example:

: second kanji  means "rule" or "regulation". Also an ordinary word  meaning "formal" or "legitimate".
: second kanji  means "rule" or "regulation". Also an ordinary word  meaning "correct" or proper".
: second kanji  means "historical account". Also used for another masculine given name Seiki.
: second kanji  means "virtue" or "morality". Also a Japanese era name Shōtoku.

People
People with the name Masanori include:

Arts and entertainment
 , Japanese photographer
 , Japanese music critic and radio personality
 , stage name Pierre Taki, Japanese singer
 , Japanese actor and comedian
 , Japanese filmmaker
 Masanori Mark Christianson (born 1976), American guitarist and songwriter
 , Japanese manga artist

Government and politics
 , general of the Hosokawa clan in the Ōnin War
 , daimyō of Hiroshima Domain
 , daimyō of Honjō Domain 
 , daimyō of Tsuwano Domain
 , daimyō of Odawara Domain
 , daimyō of Mutsuura Domain
 , Japanese bureaucrat and politician
 , Japanese journalist and military commentator
 , governor of Ishikawa prefecture
 , mayor of Hakodate

Science
 , Japanese microbiologist
 , Japanese zoologist, essayist, and filmmaker
 , Japanese mathematician
 , Japanese astronomer
 , Japanese astronomer

Sport
 , Japanese swimmer
 , Japanese footballer
, Japanese speed skater
 , Japanese sumo wrestler
 , Japanese baseball player
 , Japanese cyclist
 , alias of Kim Duk, Zainichi Korean wrestler
 , Japanese racing car driver
 , Japanese sumo wrestler
 , Japanese footballer
 , Japanese baseball player
 , Japanese footballer
 , Japanese footballer
 , stage name The Great Sasuke, Japanese professional wrestler
 , Japanese baseball catcher
 , Japanese football manager
, Japanese hurdler and bobsledder
 , Japanese mixed martial artist
 , Japanese golfer
 , Japanese footballer
 , Japanese fencer
 , Japanese baseball pitcher
 , Japanese mixed martial artist
 , Japanese baseball pitcher
 , Japanese baseball pitcher
 , Japanese footballer

References

Japanese masculine given names